This is an alphabetical list of songs recorded by Ada Jones.

A
 "All Aboard for Blanket Bay" (1911)
 "All She Gets from the Iceman Is Ice" (1908) [Edison]
 "All She Gets from the Iceman Is Ice" (1908) [Victor]
 "Any Little Girl that's a Nice Little Girl Is the Right Little Girl for Me" (1911)
 "Arab Love Song" (1909)

B
 "Barney McGee" (1909)
 "Beatrice Fairfax, Tell Me What to Do" (1916)
 "Beautiful Eyes" (1909) [Columbia]
 "Beautiful Eyes" (1909) [Indestructible]
 "Bedtime at the Zoo" (1914)
 "Before I Go and Marry, I Will Have a Word with You" (1910)
 "By the Light of the Silvery Moon" (1909) [Indestructible]
 "By the Light of the Silvery Moon" (1910) [Edison]

C
Call Me Up Some Rainy Afternoon (1910)

Can't You See I'm Lonely (1905)

Come Over Here, It's a Wonderful Place (1917)

Cross My Heart and Hope to Die (1917)

D
Don't Get Married Any More, Ma (1906) [Indestructible]

Don't Get Married Any More, Ma (1907) [Edison]

Don't Get Married Any More, Ma (1907) [Victor]

Down in Gossip Row (1912)

F
Fraidy Cat (1910)

G
Games of Childhood Days (1909)

Goodbye Alexander (World War I Song) (1918)

Goodbye Molly Brown (1909)

Grand Baby or Baby Grand (1913)

H
Has Anybody Here Seen Kelly (1910)

Have You Seen My Henry Brown (1906)

He Lost Her in the Subway (1907)

He Never Even Said Goodbye (1907)

He's Me Pal (1910)

He's the Makin's of a Dam'd Fine Man (1916)

I
I Just Can't Make My Eyes Behave (1907)

I Miss You Honey, Miss You All the Time (1910)

I Remember You (1909)

I Should Worry and Get Wrinkles (1913)

I Want to Be a Merry Merry Widow (1908)

If I Knock the L Out of Kelly (1916)

If That's Your Idea of a Wonderful Time (1915)

If the Man in the Moon Were a Coon (1907) [Victor]

If the Man in the Moon Were a Coon (1907) [Columbia]

If They'ed Only Move Old Ireland Over Here (1914)

I'm in Love With the Slide Trombone (1907)

I'm Looking for a Nice Young Fellow Who Is Looking for a Nice Young Girl (1911)

I'm the Only Star that Twinkles on Broadway (1906)

Irish Blood (1910) [Edison]

Irish Blood (1910) [Indestructible]

Is There Anything Else I Can Do For You (1910)

It's Got to Be Someone I Love (1911) [Victor]

It's Got to Be Someone I Love (1913) [Edison]

I've Got Rings on My Fingers (1909) [Indestructible]

I've Got Rings on My Fingers (1909) [Columbia]

I've Got the Finest Man (1913)

J
Just Plain Folks (1911) [Columbia]

Just Plain Folks (1913) [Edison]

M
Mister Othello (1909)

Mother May I Go in For a Swim (1915)

My Carolina Lady (1905)

My Hula Hula Love (1911)

My Irish Rose (1907)

My Pony Boy (1909)

N
Nix on the Glow Worm, Lena (1910)

Now I Have to Call Him Father (1909)

O
Oh, Mr. Dream Man, Please Let Me Dream Some More (1912)

Oh, You Blondy! (1910)

Oh, You Candy Kid (1909)

Oh, What I Know About You (1910)

Out of a City of Six Million People, Why Did You Pick on Me (1916)

P
Poor John (1907) [Edison]

Poor John (1907) [Victor]

Put on Your Slippers and Fill Up Your Pipe, You're Not Going Bye-Bye Tonight (1917) [Victor]

Put on Your Slippers and Fill Up Your Pipe, You're Not Going Bye-Bye Tonight (1917) [Edison]

Put on Your Slippers, You're in for the Night (1911)

Put Your Arms Around Me Honey (1913) [Edison]

R
Red Head (1909)

Ring Ting-a-ling (1912)

Row! Row! Row! (1913)

S
Seesaw (1908)

She Forgot to Bring Him Back (1907) [Indestructible]

She Forgot to Bring Him Back (1908) [Edison]

She Forgot to Bring Him Back (1908) [Victor]

So Long Mary (1906)

Some Boy (1913)

Somebody Loves You (1913)

Somebody's Coming To My House
(1913)
[Edison]

Sweet Marie (1893)

T
That Dublin Rag (1911)

The Bullfrog and the Coon (1907)

The Yama Yama Man (1909)

They Always Pick On Me (1911)

Tickle Toes (1910)

Top of the Morning (Bridget McCue) (1911)

W
Waiting at the Church (My Wife Won't Let Me) (1906)

We've Kept the Golden Rule (1911)

When Grandma Was a Girl (????)

Whistle and I'll Wait for You (1909)

Whistling Jim (1913)

Wilhelm, the Grocer (1913)

Willie's Got Another Girl Now (1909)

Woman of Importance (1906)

Wouldn't You Like to Have Me for a Sweetheart (1907)

Y
You Can Look and You Can Listen (1908) [Indestructible]

You Can Look and You Can Listen (1909) [Victor]

You Can Tango, You Can Trot, Dear but Be Sure and Hesitate (1914)

You Will Have to Sing an Irish Song (1908) [Victor]

You Will Have to Sing an Irish Song (1911) [Columbia]

Ypsilanti (1915)

Ada Jones with Len Spencer
A Coon Courtship (1907)

A Darktown Courtship (Bashful Henry and Lovin' Lucy) (1906) [Columbia]

A Darktown Courtship (Bashful Henry and Lovin' Lucy) (1906) [Victor]

Becky and Izzy (A Yiddish Courtship) (1907)

Blondy and Her Johnny (1907)

Bronco Bob and His Little Cheyenne (1907) [Edison]

Bronco Bob and His Little Cheyenne (1907) [United]

Cherry Hill Jerry (1907)

Chimmie and Maggie at the Hippodrome (1905)

Chimmie and Maggie in Nickel Land (1907)

Coming Home from Coney Island (1906)

Dance Hall Scene (1907)

Down on the Farm (1906)

Flannigan St. Patrick's Day (1906)

Fritzy and Louisa (1906) [Edison]

Fritzy and Louisa (1906) [Victor]

Fritzy and Louisa (1906) [Silvertone]

Fun at the Music Counter (1908)

Henry and Hilda at the Schuetzenfest (1908)

Henry's Return (1907)

Herman & Minnie (1907)

House Cleaning Time (1908) [Edison]

House Cleaning Time (1908) [Victor]

House Cleaning Time (1908) [Indestructible]

How Matt Got the Mitten (1907)

Italian Specialty (1906)

Jim Jackson's Last Farewell (1906)

Jimmie and Maggie at the Hippodrome (1905)

Katrina's Valentine (1905)

Krausmeyer Taking the Census (1910)

Let Me See You Smile (1906)

Louis and Lena (About Luna Park in Coney Island) (1905)

Maggie Clancy's New Piano (1906)

Mandy and Her Man (1906)

Meet Me Down at the Corner (1907) [Edison]

Meet Me Down at the Corner (1907) [Victor]

Mr. and Mrs. Murphy (1905)

Muggsy's Dream (1908)

Peaches and Cream (1906) [Victor]

Peaches and Cream (1913) [Edison]

Rudolph and Rosie at the Roller Rink (1908)

Sadie and Abie (1906)

Santiago Flynn (A Spanish-Irish Episode) (1907)

Schoolday Frolics (1907)

Si Perkins' Barn Dance (1909) [Victor]

Si Perkins' Barn Dance (1914) [Edison]

Sweet Peggy Magee (1909) [Victor]

Sweet Peggy Magee (1917) [Edison]

The Courtship of Barney and Eileen (1905)

The Fair Fisher and Her Catch (1905)

The Golden Wedding (1905) [Edison 9148]

The Golden Wedding (1906) [Columbia]

The Golden Wedding (1906) [Victor]

The Golden Wedding (1912) [Edison 1871]

The Original Cohens (1906)

The Widow Dooley (1908)

Ada Jones with Walter Van Brunt
All Alone (1911)

Billy, Billy, Bounce Your Baby Doll (1913)

Come Along My Mandy (1910)

Come Josephine in My Flying Machine (1911)

Emmaline (1910)

I Live Uptown (1912)

I'll Sit Right on the Moon (1912)

I'm Afraid, Pretty Maid, I'm Afraid (1912)

It's Got to Be Someone I Love (1911)

It's Nice to Be Nice, to a Nice Little Girl Like You (1911)

I've Got to Make Love to Somebody (1909)

My Little Lovin' Sugar Babe (1912)

Oh What a Night (1913)

Take Me on a Honeymoon (1909)

That Was before I Met You (1911)

When I Get You Alone Tonight (1913)

When Sunday Rolls Around (1911)

You're My Baby (1912)

Ada Jones with Will C. Robbins
He'd Keep on Saying Good Night (1914)

If You Can't Get a Girl in the Summertime (1915)

My Little Girl (1915)

External links
Recordings at archive.org.

Jones, Ada
Jones, Ada